The Globe de Cristal Award for Best Actor was first awarded in 2006.

Winners and nominees

2000s

2010s

Multiple nominees 
4 nominations
 François Cluzet (1 win)
 Albert Dupontel

3 nominations
 Romain Duris (2 win)
 Jean Dujardin
 Vincent Lindon

2 nominations
 Omar Sy (2 win)
 Vincent Cassel (1 win)
 Pierre Niney (1 win)
 Mathieu Amalric
 Roschdy Zem
 Gérard Depardieu
 Gaspard Ulliel
 François Damiens

See also 
 César Award for Best Actor

Film awards for lead actor
Best actor